Mount Barsoum is a pointed and partly snow-free peak on the west end of Martin Hills. It was positioned by the U.S. Ellsworth-Byrd Traverse Party on December 10, 1958, and was named for Lieutenant Adib H. Barsoum, U.S. Navy, Medical Officer at Ellsworth Station in 1958.

See also
 Mountains in Antarctica

Mountains of Ellsworth Land